Zolsky District is an administrative and a municipal district (raion), one of the ten in the Kabardino-Balkar Republic, Russia. It is located in the western and northwestern parts of the republic. Its administrative center is the rural locality (a settlement) of Zalukokoazhe. As of the 2010 Census, the total population of the district was 48,939, with the population of Zalukokoazhe accounting for 20.1% of that number.

Administrative and municipal status
Within the framework of administrative divisions, Zolsky District is one of the ten in the Kabardino-Balkar Republic and has administrative jurisdiction over all of its nineteen rural localities. As a municipal division, the district is incorporated as Zolsky Municipal District. Its rural localities are incorporated into fifteen rural settlements within the municipal district, except for the settlement of Zalukokoazhe, which is incorporated as Zalukokoazhe Urban Settlement. The settlement of Zalukokoazhe serves as the administrative center of both the administrative and municipal districts.

References

Notes

Sources

Districts of Kabardino-Balkaria
